Coal Bluff may refer to:

Coal Bluff, Indiana
Coal Bluff Campground and Park in Scott County, Mississippi